Schlitz Playhouse of Stars is an anthology series that was telecast from 1951 until 1959 on CBS. Offering both comedies and drama, the series was sponsored by the Joseph Schlitz Brewing Company. The title was shortened to Schlitz Playhouse beginning with the fall 1957 season.

Live to film
Initially, the show was broadcast live, but starting in the summer of 1953, some episodes were filmed in advance. Beginning with the 1956-1957 season, all of the shows were filmed.

Between October 1951 and March 1952, the hour-long show was aired at 9 p.m. In April 1952, the running time was reduced from an hour to 30 minutes. The series moved to 9:30 p.m. in the 1955 fall season.

Pilots
Three episodes served as pilots for later NBC Western series: The Restless Gun with John Payne (March 29, 1957 pilot) and Tales of Wells Fargo with Dale Robertson (as Jim Hardie; season 6, episode 12 - A Tale of Wells Fargo - aired on December 14, 1956), and the first-run syndication series Shotgun Slade  with Scott Brady (season eight, episode 14 aired on March 27, 1959). The Restless Gun pilot was based on the radio series The Six Shooter, and Payne's character had the same name, Britt Ponset, as the radio character; that name was changed to Vint Bonner when the actual series began, possibly to prevent confusion with Bret Maverick in Maverick, which debuted in 1957. The same year, Jacques Tourneur directed one episode, "Outlaw's Boots" (25 min), broadcast in December 1957.  For the 1958-1959 season, the series alternated weeks with the Lux Playhouse.

An episode of the series also was the pilot for China Smith.

Guest stars

Guest stars included the child actress Beverly Washburn, later on The New Loretta Young Show, who appeared in "The Closed Door" (1953) and "One Left Over" (1957).

Child actor Michael Winkelman, later of The Real McCoys, also appeared twice, as Joey Harlow in the 1955 episode "Fast Break" and as Jimmy Quinlin in the 1956 segment "Weapon of Courage."

Phyllis Avery appeared six times, including the episodes "The Girl Who Scared Men Off" and "Bluebeard's Seventh Wife".

Walter Coy appeared four times, including the role of Paul Hunter in "Fool Proof" in 1956.

Rodolfo Hoyos, Jr., played Colonel Louis Coca in the episode "Little War at San Dede" (1954).

Dayton Lummis appeared as editor Cartwright in "The Last Pilot Schooner" and as Arthur Healy in "Ambitious Cop" (both 1955). Tyler MacDuff made his television debut in the 1954 episode "At the Natchez Inn".

Nora Marlowe played Katherine in "The Girl in the Grass" (1957), with fellow guest stars Ray Milland and Carolyn Jones.

James Dean made a rare television appearance in "The Unlighted Road" in 1955.

Gene Kelly made his television dramatic debut in "The Life You Save" in 1957.

Others included Irene Dunne and Helen Hayes in "Not a Chance" (1951, the first episode); John Payne in "The Name is Bellingham" (1951); Rosalind Russell in "Never Wave at a WAC" (1951); Charlton Heston and June Lockhart in "One is a Lonely Number" (1951); Robert Preston and Margaret Sullavan in "The Nymph and the Lamp" (1951); John Payne and Coleen Gray in "Exit" (1951); Anthony Quinn in "Dark Fleece" (1951); Dan Duryea in "P.G." (1952); Vincent Price in "The Human Touch" (1952); Lillian Gish in "The Autobiography of Grandma Moses" (1952); Barbara Britton in "Say Hello to Pamela" (1952); Dolores del Río in "An Old Spanish Custom" (1957), etc.  Most had multiple appearances throughout the series.

Awards
In 1958, Paul Monash won an Emmy Award for Best Teleplay Writing - One Hour or Less for the episode "The Lonely Wizard". In 1954, Billboard ranked it sixth-best filmed network dramatic series; it received 264 votes, compared to 826 votes for list-topping Ford Theater, but well ahead of the series at 10th place, Revlon Mirror Theater, which only got 35 votes.

Summer reruns
Episodes of the series were rerun during the summer under several titles.  In 1958, repeats aired for two months as Adorn Playhouse.  In 1960 and 1961, the summer reruns aired as Adventure Theater.

Episodes

Season 1 (1951-52)

Season 2 (1952-53)

Data not available

Season 3 (1953-54)

Data not available

Season 4 (1954-55)

Data not available

Season 5 (1955-56)

Data not available

Season 6 (1956-57)

Data not available

Season 7 (1957-58)

Data not available

Season 8 (1958-59)

References

External links
 
 Schlitz Playhouse of Stars at CVTA with episode list

1951 American television series debuts
1959 American television series endings
1950s American anthology television series
Black-and-white American television shows
CBS original programming
English-language television shows
American live television series
Television series by CBS Studios
Television series by Universal Television